State Highway 9 (SH 9) in the U.S. state of Colorado is a  state highway through central Colorado. SH 9's southern terminus is at U.S. Route 50 (US 50) near Cañon City, and the northern terminus is at US 40 in Kremmling. SH 9 is part of the Gold Belt Byway from US 50 to High Park Road and the Colorado River Headwaters National Scenic Byway from US 40 to Trough Road.

Route description

State Highway 9 starts at a junction with US 50 west of Cañon City. It heads northwest, following Currant Creek most of the way to Currant Creek Pass where it enters an open area known as South Park. The south fork of the South Platte is crossed as the highway enters Hartsel and a junction with US 24. Just south of Fairplay, it joins northbound US 285. Switchbacks drop the highway to the Blue River which it follows north through Breckenridge to Dillon Reservoir. The highway goes around the west side of the reservoir, through Frisco and joins I 70 as it heads northeast. At Silverthorne, SH 9 leaves I 70 to continue northwest alongside the Blue River. SH 9 crosses the Colorado River just before its termination at a junction with US 40 in Kremmling.

In 2016, the state completed a wildlife crossing project to reduce wildlife-vehicle collisions between Green Mountain Reservoir and Kremmling, including 2 wildlife overpasses and 5 underpasses; the state also widened the road and shoulders.

Major intersections

References

External links

 Colorado Highways link to State Highway 9

Transportation in Park County, Colorado
Transportation in Fremont County, Colorado
Transportation in Grand County, Colorado
Transportation in Summit County, Colorado
009